The Aurus Senat is a luxury full-size sedan by Russian automaker Aurus Motors and developed by NAMI in Moscow, Russia. The armoured limousine is powered by a 4.4 litre V8 engine developed by NAMI, with a 6.6 litre V12 (634 kW) becoming available at a later date. It is the presidential state car of Russia. Development of the Senat started in 2013 with the car (in civilian S600 or official L700 versions) being put into production in 2021 at the Sollers JSC factory in Yelabuga.

The Aurus Senat is part of the Kortezh series, which will eventually include a van and an SUV. The Senat was shown publicly for the first time at the Moscow International Automobile Salon in September 2018.

Cars of the Kortezh series (also known in )  were expected to be available for export to the Middle East and China in late 2018. A civilian version of the Senat is manufactured by a joint venture between the NAMI and LiAZ firms. Expected retail prices were increased in 2018 to 10 million rubles ($160k), but in 2021, still before the first deliveries, became higher than 20 million rubles (~$300k).

Porsche and Bosch Engineering are reported to have been involved with the development of the engine.

See also
 ZiL

References

External links

 Aurus Motors
 Spot-video by Aurus Russia: Aurus Senat (YouTube)

Cars introduced in 2018
Luxury vehicles
Flagship vehicles
Limousines
Cars of Russia
Full-size vehicles
All-wheel-drive vehicles
Hybrid electric cars
Retro-style automobiles
Russian presidential state cars
Aurus vehicles